This is a list of awards and accolades awarded to Raven-Symoné.

BET Comedy Awards

|-
| 2004 || That's So Raven || Outstanding Lead Actress in a Comedy Series|| 
|-
| 2005 || That's So Raven || Outstanding Lead Actress in a Comedy Series || 
|-
| 2005 || Kim Possible: So the Drama || Best Performance in an Animated Theatrical Film || 
|}

Black Reel Awards

|-
| 2004 || The Cheetah Girls || Television: Best Actress || 
|}

Daytime Emmy Awards

|-
| 2016 || The View || Outstanding Entertainment Talk Show Host || 
|-
| 2017 || The View || Outstanding Entertainment Talk Show Host || 
|-
| 2018 || Raven's Home || Outstanding Performer in a Children's Program || 
|}

Gracie Allen Awards

|-
| 2005 || That's So Raven || Outstanding Female Lead in a Comedy || 
|}

Kids' Choice Awards

|-
| 2002 || Dr. Dolittle 2 || Favorite Female Movie Star || 
|-
| 2004 
|rowspan= 5| That's So Raven 
|rowspan= 5| Favorite Television Actress 
|
|-
| 2005
| 
|-
| 2006 
| 
|-
| 2007 
| 
|-
| 2008 
| 
|-
| 2019 ||rowspan=4| Raven's Home ||rowspan=3|Favorite Female TV Star || 
|-
| 2020 || 
|-
| 2021 || 
|-
| 2022 || Favorite Female TV Star (Kids) || 
|}

NAACP Image Awards

|-
| 1996 || Hangin' with Mr. Cooper || Outstanding Youth Actor/Actress || 
|-
| 2002 || Dr. Dolittle 2 || Outstanding Youth Actor/Actress || 
|-
| 2004 || That's So Raven || Outstanding Performance in a Youth/Children's Program (Series or Special) || 
|-
| 2005 || That's So Raven || Outstanding Performance in a Youth/Children's Program (Series or Special) || 
|-
| 2006 || That's So Raven || Outstanding Performance in a Youth/Children's Program (Series or Special) || 
|-
| 2007 || That's So Raven || Outstanding Performance in a Youth/Children's Program (Series or Special) || 
|-
| rowspan=2| 2008 || That's So Raven || Outstanding Performance in a Youth/Children's Program (Series or Special) || 
|-
| That's So Raven || Outstanding Actress in a Comedy Series || 
|-
| 2018 || Raven's Home || Outstanding Performance in a Youth/Children's Program (Series or Special) || 
|-
|}

NAMIC Vision Awards

|-
| 2004 || That's So Raven || Best Comedic Performance|| 
|-
| 2005 || That's So Raven || Best Comedic Performance || 
|-
| 2008 || That's So Raven || Best Performance - Comedy || 
|}

Nollywood and African Film Critics Awards

|-
| 2015 || A Girl Like Grace || Best Supporting Actress in a Foreign Film|| 
|}

Radio Disney Music Awards

|-
| 2005 || Raven-Symoné || Best Actor/Actress-Turned-Singer|| 
|-
| 2006 || Raven-Symoné || Favorite TV Star Who Sings|| 
|-
| 2006 || Raven-Symoné ||Most Stylish Singer ||
|}

Teen Choice Awards

|-
| 2004 || That's So Raven || Choice TV Actress: Comedy|| 
|-
| 2005 || That's So Raven || Choice TV Actress: Comedy|| 
|-
| 2006 || That's So Raven || TV - Choice Actress: Comedy || 
|-
| 2011 || State of Georgia ||Choice Summer TV Star: Female || 
|}

TV Land Awards

|-
| 2011 || The Cosby Show || Impact Award (to cast) || 
|}

Young Artist Awards

|-
| 1990 || The Cosby Show || Outstanding Performance by an Actress Under Nine Years of Age|| 
|-
| 1991 || The Cosby Show || Exceptional Performance by a Young Actress Under Nine|| 
|-
| 1993 || The Cosby Show || Outstanding Actress Under Ten in a Television Series|| 
|-
| 1994 || Hangin' with Mr. Cooper || Best Youth Comedienne || 
|-
| 2004 || That's So Raven || Best Performance in a TV Series (Comedy or Drama): Leading Young Actress || 
|-
| rowspan=2| 2005 || Raven-Symoné ||Michael Landon Award || 
|-
| That's So Raven || Outstanding Young Performers in a TV Series || 
|}

Young Star Awards

|-
| 1999 || Zenon: Girl of the 21st Century || Best Performance by a Young Actress in a Mini-Series/Made for TV Film || 
|}

Children's and Family Emmy Awards

|-
| 2022 || Raven's Home || Outstanding Directing for a Multiple Camera Program || 
|}

References

Lists of awards received by American actor
Awards